Armeno is a comune (municipality) in Italy. Armeno may also refer to
 Armenian (disambiguation)
San Gregorio Armeno, a church and a monastery in Naples, Italy
Gennaro Armeno (born 1994), Italian football midfielder